Michael Walter Ulmer (born December 28, 1954) is a former American football defensive back who played for the Chicago Bears and Philadelphia Eagles of the National Football League (NFL). He played college football at Doane University.

References

External links
JustSportsStats.com career statistics

1954 births
Living people
American football defensive backs
Doane Tigers football players
Chicago Bears players
Calgary Stampeders players
San Antonio Gunslingers players
Philadelphia Eagles players